Coming Days, released in 1995 on Chiswick Records, was the third album released by Irish artist Ron Kavana, the second credited to "Alias Ron Kavana".  Versions of two songs - "Johnny" and "Irish Ways" were previously released on the LILT album For The Children.

Track listing

Medley: "Galtee Mór/Irish Ways/Jigs - Daniel O'Connell/Saddle the Pony" (Kavana, Traditional) - 12:11
"Thoughts of Abilene" (Kavana, Del Lyon) - 3:44
"Psycho Mary's Voodoo Blues" (Kavana, Whitwham) - 5:57
"Hand Me Down" (Kavana, Watkins) - 4:06
"Connemara/Handcuffs" [instrumental] (Kavana, Molloy) - 3:35
"Ain't That Peculiar/Foxhunter's Reel" (Warren "Pete" Moore, Smokey Robinson, Robert Rogers, Marvin Tarplin) - 4:16
"Pennies for Black Babies" (Kavana) - 3:14
"Johnny" (Kavana) - 7:13
"Cajun Ceili" (Kavana, Watkins) - 3:32
"Freedom Crazy" (Kavana) - 4:01
"If I Had a Rocket Launcher" (Bruce Cockburn) - 4:18
"Walk, Don't Walk" (Kavana, Miller) - 3:55

Personnel

Alias Band
Ron Kavana – Vocals, Acoustic, Electric & Slide Guitars, Mandolin, Mandola, Banjo, Keyboards, Synthesiser, Percussion, Drum Programming.
Mick Molloy - Acoustic & Electric Guitars, Mandolin, Mandola, Percussion & Backing vocals
Richie Robertson - Bass, Percussion & Backing vocals
Les Morgan - Drums & Percussion
Fran Byrne - Button Accordion & Percussion

Guest musicians
Geraint Watkins - Keyboards, Grand Piano, Piano Accordion, Backing & Lead Vocals
Tomas Lynch - Uilleann Pipes
Tozie Lynch - Bones
Len Davies - Bones
Fife Toumani - Acoustic Guitar, Mbira & Kora
From BOILED IN LEAD:
Drew Miller - Dive Bomb Bass & vocals
Todd Menton - Tin Whistle
Robin "Adan" Anderson: Dourbakee
From SONS OF THE DESERT:
Joseph Docherty - Fiddle
Tracey Booth - Backing Vocals

Recorded at Elephant & Watershed Studios

1995 albums
Ron Kavana albums
Chiswick Records albums